Lemta, historically Leptiminus, is a town in Tunisia with a history going back over 3,000 years.

History
The history of the town starts in the 13th century b.c.e. with the founding attributed to Phoenician sailors.

Leptiminus, as it was called, became an ancient port city in Tunisia that flourished under Roman rule in the time of the empire.  Hannibal, following the second Punic War, disembarked here on his return from Italy.

Today 
The growing town, now a textile production center, hosts several excavation sites currently under Tunisian, American, and Canadian direction.

References

External links

Roman sites in Tunisia
Communes of Tunisia
Roman amphitheaters in North Africa
Populated places in Monastir Governorate
Ancient Roman buildings and structures in Tunisia